Nina Nesbitt (born 11 July 1994) is a Scottish  singer and songwriter. She has two top 40 singles, and is known for her single "Stay Out", which peaked at No. 21 on the UK Singles Chart in April 2013.

Her first EP, The Apple Tree, was released in April 2012 and peaked at No. 6 on the iTunes download charts after receiving airplay on BBC Radio 1, and also peaked at the top of the iTunes singer/songwriter chart. The Way in the World EP and single were released on 23 July 2013, as a follow-up to "Stay Out". In August 2013, she recorded a cover version of Fleetwood Mac's "Don't Stop", for a new John Lewis advertising campaign, subsequently charting at number 61. Nesbitt released her debut studio album, Peroxide, on 17 February 2014.

As a songwriter, she has written for other artists including Jessie Ware, Olivia Holt, Don Diablo and The Shires. In February 2019, Nesbitt released her second studio album, The Sun Will Come Up, the Seasons Will Change. In September 2022, she released her third studio album Älskar.

Early life
Nesbitt was born on 11 July 1994 in Livingston, and attended the small village school in Bellsquarry, Livingston. At 12, she moved to Balerno, a suburb of Edinburgh, and attended Balerno Community High School. Neither of her parents are musical - her father, Mike, worked in the electronics industry and her mother Caty, who is originally from Sweden, was a childcare worker.

Nesbitt plays the guitar, piano and flute. She began playing the guitar at the age of fifteen. After hearing Taylor Swift's album Fearless (2008), she uploaded her first cover to YouTube. The site's positive feedback inspired her to continue writing and recording songs in her bedroom, and uploading the videos to her YouTube channel. As a child, she competed in regional and national gymnastic competitions for both Pentland Rhythmic Gymnastics Club and Scotland. She was also part of the Scottish Team training for the Commonwealth Games.

Career

2011–2012: Early career
Nesbitt met musician Ed Sheeran before a radio gig he was scheduled to perform in Edinburgh. After asking him for advice for aspiring singer-songwriters, and playing him a song on his guitar, she was invited to support him on his European tour. She was also invited to support Example after he heard her cover of his song "Stay Awake". She also appeared in the music video for Sheeran's single "Drunk".

2012–2013: The Apple Tree, Boy, Stay Out and Way in the World

Her second EP, The Apple Tree, was released in April 2012 via AWAL and reached No. 6 on the iTunes download charts after receiving airplay on BBC Radio 1, and also reached No. 1 on the iTunes singer/songwriter chart. On 9 October 2012, Nesbitt embarked on her second UK headline tour, to support the release of her debut single, "Boy", under new label, Island Records. The tour included support from singer-songwriter Josh Kumra and singer-songwriter Billy Lockett. The tour commenced on 9 October 2012 at Òran Mór, Glasgow, Scotland and finished on 18 October 2012 at Dingwalls, London, England. Her third EP, Stay Out, was released on 8 April 2013; its title track of the same name entered the charts at No. 21 in April 2013. Her next EP, Way in the World, was released on 21 July 2013. The title track was released as a single, and the music video released on 12 June 2013. Nesbitt's next single was a cover of the Fleetwood Mac song, "Don't Stop", and is used in an advert for the department store John Lewis. On 6 September 2013, Nesbitt sang "Flower of Scotland" at Hampden Park before Scotland faced Belgium in a Group A World Cup Qualifier.

2013–2014: Peroxide

On 25 November 2013, Nesbitt announced on her Twitter and Facebook pages that her debut studio album, Peroxide, would be released on 17 February 2014 in the United Kingdom. Nesbitt did an album signing tour around the UK, starting in Edinburgh on the day the album was released. Peroxide entered the UK Album Charts at number 1 in Scotland and 11 in the rest of the UK. The lead single from the album, "Selfies" was released on 9 February 2014. She released her fifth EP, Nina Nesbitt, exclusively in the US on 1 April 2014.

2016–2017: Modern Love EP and Life in Colour
In 2016, Nesbitt announced the release of her newest EP, Modern Love, featuring her "radical new look." She also announced a three-date UK Tour, that took place from 26 to 28 January. Following its World Exclusive on Radio 1, her single "Chewing Gum" became available for download on Apple Music and Spotify on 10 January. On 27 April, Nesbitt performed at the Young Scot Awards at Edinburgh's International Conference Centre. In June, she started the project Songs I Wrote for You, where she asked her fans to send her their personal love stories and she would write a song about it. In October 2016, she released a five-track EP titled Life in Colour with the songs of the project under her own label.

2016–2019: The Sun Will Come Up, the Seasons Will Change
In May 2016, Nesbitt disclosed that she had left her record label and was now an independent artist. In November 2016, Nesbitt signed a recording contract with indie label Cooking Vinyl. On 2 July 2017, she served as a supporting act for Justin Bieber during British Summer Time in Hyde Park, London. She released a new single, "The Moments I'm Missing", on 14 July 2017. On 8 September 2017 she released her next single, "The Best You Had", which was made Greg James' 'Tune of the Week' on Radio 1 and added to the Radio 1 playlist. Taylor Swift later added "The Best You Had" to her 'Favourite Songs' playlist on Apple Music and Spotify, while actress Chloë Grace Moretz tweeted about the song to her followers. Nesbitt then released "Somebody Special" as the third single from her second album.

In October 2017, she played two intimate shows in New York City and Los Angeles. In December 2017, Nesbitt won the 'Evolution Award' at the SSE Scottish Music Awards.

Between March and April 2018, Nesbitt toured the United States with Jake Bugg. She also revealed new track "Psychopath" for the launch of Spotify's 'Louder Together', a program bringing artists together to collaborate on an original Spotify Singles song in the spirit of community, empowerment and inspiration.

The titular track "The Sun Will Come Up, the Seasons Will Change" was released as a promotional single in May. Nesbitt has said that it is "like a self-help song and she hopes that people can listen to it in times of need and be reminded that things are constantly changing". The song was also featured in an episode of Life Sentence, an American television series.

In summer 2018, Nesbitt played twelve festivals in the UK, and also performed at SXSW, Midem and The Great Escape. She later sold out three consecutive London shows (at Heaven, The Islington and Camden Assembly), and supported acts such as James Arthur, Jesse McCartney, MAX and Lewis Capaldi on tours.

On 10 August 2018, Nesbitt released her fourth single from the album, "Loyal to Me", which was produced by Fraser T. Smith. In October 2018, Nesbitt announced that her second album, The Sun Will Come Up, the Seasons Will Change will be released on 1 February 2019 through Cooking Vinyl.

The Sun Will Come Up, the Seasons Will Change was released on 1 February 2019, to a positive critic reaction. The Independent awarded the record four stars and The Times gave it three, whilst CelebMix awarded the album five stars saying, "February is far too early to talk about albums of the year. But, really, is it going to get better than this?". On the same day, Nesbitt also released a new music video for her fifth single from the album, titled "Is It Really Me You're Missing?". Nesbitt then embarked on a headlining tour to support The Sun Will Come Up, the Seasons Will Change, with the North American and UK legs spanning from February to April. She also toured in Australia and New Zealand from 28 May to 1 June.

In March 2019, it was announced that Nesbitt would be supporting Jess Glynne on the American leg of the Always in Between Tour.

2020–present: Älskar
Leading up to the release of her third studio album, Älskar, on 2 September 2022, Nesbitt released several singles including "Summer Fling" and "Life's a Bitch" (which are featured as bonus tracks on the deluxe version of the album).

Further songs released prior to the albums official release that are included on the standard edition of the album include include: "When You Lose Someone", "Dinner Table", "Pressure Makes Diamonds", "No Time (For My Life to Suck)", and "Colours of You".

Beginning in November 2022, Nesbitt will tour her album throughout the United Kingdom and Europe.

Philanthropy
Nesbitt was part of the mothers2mothers fund raising dinner, raising half a million pounds for the charity. She also attended the Women in the World Summit, discussing the impact of body image in the Internet era.

She has worked with brands such as Calvin Klein and American Eagle and was chosen to attend the Women in the World Summit alongside Nicole Kidman and Cara Delevingne.

Personal life
Nesbitt was in a relationship with singer-songwriter Ed Sheeran and she appeared in his music video for "Drunk" in 2012. She wrote most of her album, Peroxide (2014), about Sheeran, while she was the subject of Sheeran's songs "Nina" and "Photograph".

In 2016, Nesbitt said that two people were stalking her.

Discography

 Peroxide (2014)
 The Sun Will Come Up, the Seasons Will Change (2019)
 Älskar (2022)

References

External links
 
 
 
 

1990s births
Year of birth missing (living people)
Living people
Musicians from Edinburgh
People educated at Balerno Community High School
21st-century Scottish women singers
Scottish pop singers
Scottish people of Swedish descent
Scottish singer-songwriters
Universal Music Group artists
Island Records artists